Helen Frank (born 1 January 1971) is a British swimmer. She competed in the women's 200 metre breaststroke at the 1988 Summer Olympics.

References

External links
 

1971 births
Living people
British female swimmers
Olympic swimmers of Great Britain
Swimmers at the 1988 Summer Olympics
Sportspeople from Leeds
Female breaststroke swimmers